Alexander Briley (born April 12, 1951) is an American singer who was the original "G.I." in the disco recording act Village People.

Biography 
Alex Briley was born in Harlem, New York City, in 1951, the son of a Christian minister. Raised in Harlem and later Mount Vernon, New York, Briley sang in church from an early age and studied voice at the University of Hartford. Briley had two brothers, Timothy and Jonathan.

Briley was introduced to producer/composer Jacques Morali by Village People member Victor Willis. He originally performed in jeans and a T-shirt, but he took the role of a soldier for the album Cruisin' in 1978, and appeared as a sailor when the group recorded In the Navy in 1979.

Jonathan Briley 
Alex Briley's younger brother, Jonathan (1958–2001), worked as an audio engineer at Windows on the World on the 106th floor of the North Tower of the World Trade Center and perished in the terrorist attacks of September 11, 2001. In 2005, Jonathan was speculated by several people to be The Falling Man – the figure depicted in an iconic photo of a man falling to his death from the North Tower. He was one of an estimated 100–200 people who died on 9/11 either by jumping from, falling from, or being pushed out of the upper stories of the Twin Towers.

References 

1951 births
Living people
African-American male singers
American male pop singers
Singers from New York (state)
People from Harlem
Musicians from Mount Vernon, New York
University of Hartford alumni
Village People members
20th-century American singers
21st-century American singers